Neocomitidae is a family of Lower Cretaceous ammonitids comprising genera with strongly ribbed evolute (all whorls exposed) to smooth, fairly involute (inner whorls mostly hidden) shells.

In the 1957 description of the family Neocomitidae was regarded as the subfamily Neocomitinae within the Berriasellidae, a family within the Perisphinctoidea that ranged from the Late Jurassic into the Early Cretaceous.  In a more recent treatment  berriaselids are regarded as a subfamily within the Neocomitidae.

Current opinion differers from the 1967 placement of Neocomitidae in the Perisphinctoidea but rather includes it in the superfamily Endemoceratoidea.

Genera
Acanthodiscus Uhlig, 1905
Argentiniceras Spath, 1924
Berriasella Uhlig, 1905
Decliveites Aguirre-Urreta and Rawson, 2010
Delphinella Le Hegarat, 1973
Delphinites Sayn, 1901
Distoloceras Hyatt, 1900
Elenaella Nikolov, 1966
Eleniceras Breskovski, 1967
Ellenaela Nikolov, 1966
Favrella Douvillé, 1909
Frenguelliceras Leanza, 1945
Hatchericeras Stanton, 1901
Jabronella Nikolov, 1966
Karakaschiceras Thieuloy, 1971
Kilianella Uhlig, 1905
Lemencia Donze and Enay 1961
Leopoldia Mayer-Eymar, 1887
Luppovella Nikolov, 1966
Lyticoceras Hyatt, 1900
Neocomites Uhlig, 1905
Neohoploceras Spath, 1939
Paquiericeras Sayn, 1901
Parandiceras Spath, 1939
Pseudoneocomites Hoedemaeker, 1982
Pseudosubplanites Le Hegarat, 1973
Sarasinella Uhlig, 1905
Subalpinites Mazenot, 1939
Substeueroceras Spath, 1922
Thurmanniceras Cossmann, 1901
Tirnovella Nikolov, 1966

References

External links 
 
 

Ammonitida families
Perisphinctoidea
Cretaceous ammonites
Early Cretaceous first appearances
Early Cretaceous extinctions